Alexander Malcolm (9 November 1867 – 18 March 1951) was a Scotland international rugby union player.

Rugby Union career

Amateur career

He played rugby union for Glasgow University.

Provincial career

He was capped by Glasgow District in the inter-city match of 1887.

He was capped by West of Scotland District in their match against East of Scotland District on 11 February 1888.

International career

Malcolm played once for Scotland; in the 1888 Home Nations Championship match against Ireland on 10 March 1888.

Ranching in Canada

He emigrated to Canada in late 1888 and became a farmer, rather than pursuing a career in architecture. The Squakum Ranch, at the end of present day Malcolm Rd, was a commercial orchard on the banks of the Fraser River. Alex bought the property in the early 1890s. Apart from returns to Scotland, Lake Errock was his home for about 50 years. Their longest visit away was about 1896–1906.

Marriage and children

In 1891, he married Mary Alberta Ross, who died in 1943.

They had four sons and two daughters. The sons were Colin Ross (1892–1945), Alexander George (1894–1947), Gordon Ross (1896–1917), and Ian. The daughters were Helen Ross (1896–1959) and Mary Hunter (1906–?).

References

1867 births
1951 deaths
Scottish rugby union players
Scotland international rugby union players
Glasgow University RFC players
Glasgow District (rugby union) players
West of Scotland District (rugby union) players
Rugby union players from Glasgow
Rugby union forwards